Rho guanine nucleotide exchange factor TIAM1 is a protein that in humans is encoded by the TIAM1 gene.

Structure 
TIAM1 is tightly associate with BAIAP2 as a subunit.  It contains one DH (DBL-homology) domain, one PDZ domain, two PH domains and one Ras-binding RBD domain.

Function 
TIAM1 modulates the activity of Rho GTP-binding proteins and connects extracellular signals to cytoskeletal activities. In addition, TIAM1 activates Rac1, CDC42, and to a lesser extent RhoA.

Clinical significance 
TIAM1 is found in virtually all tumor cell lines examined including B- and T-lymphomas, neuroblastomas, melanomas and carcinomas.

Interactions 
T-cell lymphoma invasion and metastasis-inducing protein 1 has been shown to interact with ANK1, Myc, RAC1 and PPP1R9B.

Tiam1 interacts also with para-cingulin, that plays a role in recruiting Tiam1 to junctions and thus activate Rac1 at epithelial junctions.

References

Further reading 

 
 
 
 
 
 
 
 
 
 
 
 
 
 
 
 
 

Peripheral membrane proteins